The Piney Woods is a temperate coniferous forest terrestrial ecoregion in the Southern United States covering  of East Texas, southern Arkansas, western Louisiana, and southeastern Oklahoma. These coniferous forests are dominated by several species of pine as well as hardwoods including hickory and oak. Historically the most dense part of this forest region was the Big Thicket though the lumber industry dramatically reduced the forest concentration in this area and throughout the Piney Woods during the 19th and 20th centuries. The World Wide Fund for Nature considers the Piney Woods to be one of the critically endangered ecoregions of the United States. The United States Environmental Protection Agency (EPA) defines most of this ecoregion as the South Central Plains.

Setting
The Piney Woods cover a  area of eastern Texas, northwestern Louisiana, southwestern Arkansas and the southeastern corner of Oklahoma. They are bounded on the east by the Mississippi lowland forests, on the south by the Western Gulf coastal grasslands, on the west by the East Central Texas forests and the Texas blackland prairies, on the northwest by the Central forest-grasslands transition, and on the north by the Ozark Mountain forests. They receive  of precipitation annually.

Flora

Longleaf, shortleaf, and loblolly pines, along with bluejack and post oaks, dominate sandhills. A well-developed understory grows beneath the sparse canopy, and includes yaupon holly and flowering dogwood. Pine savannas consist of scattered longleaf and loblolly pines alongside black tupelos, sweetgums, and in acid soils along creeks sweetbay magnolias. Other common trees in this ecoregion include eastern redbud, red maple, southern sugar maple, and American elm. American wisteria, a vine, may cover groves of trees.

Two varieties of wetlands are common in the Piney Woods: bayous are generally found near rivers and sloughs are generally found near creeks. In bayous bald cypress, Spanish moss, and water lilies are common plants. Sloughs are shallow pools of standing water that most trees are not capable of growing in. Other species, such as the purple bladderwort, a small carnivorous plant, have found niches in sloughs. A baygall is another type of wetland found the Piney Woods and other forest of the Gulf Coast states in the USA.

Hardy species of prickly pear cactus and yucca can be found in the forests where deep sands occur. 

The indigenous Texas trailing phlox (Phlox nivalis texensis), an endangered species, grows in the sandy soils of longleaf pine forests.

Piney Woods gallery

Fauna 
Mammals: Common species in the Piney Woods include White-tailed deer (Odocoileus virginianus), Virginia opossum (Didelphis virginiana), northern raccoon (Procyon lotor), striped skunk (Mephitis mephitis), eastern mole (Scalopus aquaticus), least shrew (Cryptotis parva), eastern gray squirrel (Sciurus carolinensis), eastern fox squirrel (Sciurus niger), and eastern cottontail (Sylvilagus floridanus). Somewhat less common are the northern river otter (Lontra canadensis), bobcat (Lynx rufus), gray fox (Urocyon cinereoargenteus), southern short-tailed shrew (Blarina carolinensis), American beaver (Castor canadensis), and swamp rabbit (Sylvilagus aquaticus). Some carnivores such as the eastern spotted skunk (Spilogale putorius), ringtail (Bassariscus astutus), long-tailed weasel (Mustela frenata), American mink (Mustela vison), and red fox (Vulpes vulpes), are uncommon, rarely seen, and in decline. Over a dozen species of bats occur in the region, some migratory like the Brazilian free-tailed bat (Tadarida brasiliensis) and silvered-haired bat (Lasionycteris noctivagans), others are year round residents like the Seminole bat (Lasiurus seminolus), evening bat (Nycticeius humeralis), Rafinesque's big-eared bat (Corynorhinus rafinesquii), a threatened species in Texas. Rodents found in the Piney Woods include the southern flying squirrel (Glaucomys volans), common muskrat (Ondatra zibethicus), Baird's pocket gopher (Geomys breviceps), woodland vole (Microtus pinetorum), and about 10 additional native rats and mice.

Several of the larger carnivores that once occurred in the Piney Woods are entirely extirpated, including the hog-nosed skunk (Conepatus leuconotus), red wolf (Canis rufus), jaguar (Panthera onca), and ocelot (Leopardus pardalis). The mountain lion (Puma concolor) and black bear (Ursus americanus) have also been extirpated from most areas; however, very rare sightings or remains are occasionally documented, likely representing wandering individuals rather than breeding populations. Stable populations of black bears occur in adjacent areas north and east of the Piney Woods and they appear to be slowly increasing in numbers and dispersing. As of 2020, however, the black bear is largely extirpated from most quarters, and rare in peripheral areas. With the clearing of forest and decline of the native predators (or competitors), the nine-banded armadillo (Dasypus novemcinctus), coyotes (Canis latrans), and black-tailed jackrabbit (Lepus californicus) have expanded their ranges eastward into the region. Other species have been introduced into the region such as the nutria or coypu (Myocastor coypus), house mouse (Mus musculus), roof rat (Rattus rattus), and Norway rat (Rattus norvegicus). Feral house cats (Felis catus) and feral pigs (Sus scrofa) pose threats to native fauna and are serious conservation concerns.

Birds: With some species migrating through in the spring and fall, others nesting in the spring and summer months, and still others wintering in the region, well over 300 species of birds occur in the Piney Woods. A few of the many year round residents include the wood duck (Aix sponsa), black vulture (Coragyps atratus), red-shouldered hawk (Buteo lineatus), American kestrel (Falco sparverius), wild turkey (Meleagris gallopavo), northern bobwhite (Colinus virginianus), American woodcock (Scolopax minor), greater roadrunner (Geococcyx californianus), red-cockaded woodpecker (Picoides borealis), loggerhead shrike (Lanius ludovicianus), northern mockingbird (Mimus polyglottos), brown thrasher (Toxostoma rufum), Carolina chickadee (Poecile carolinensis), brown-headed nuthatch (Sitta pusilla), pine warbler (Dendroica pinus), Bachman's sparrow (Aimophila aestivalis), and fish crow (Corvus ossifragus). Many additional species migrate from regions south and nest in the Piney Woods in the spring and summer, such as the anhinga (Anhinga anhinga), yellow-crowned night-heron (Nyctanassa violacea), little blue heron (Egretta caerulea), snowy egret (Egretta thula), purple gallinule (Porphyrula martinica), Chuck-will's-widow (Caprimulgus carolinensis), scissor-tailed flycatcher (Tyrannus forficatus), prairie warbler (Dendroica discolor), Swainson's warbler (Limnothlypis swainsonii), and painted bunting (Passerina ciris). Conversely, a different assemblage of birds migrate from the north to spend the winters months in the region, including the Canada goose (Branta canadensis), ring-necked duck (Aythya collaris), hooded merganser (Lophodytes cucullatus), blue-headed vireo (Vireo solitarius), Henslow's sparrow (Ammodramus henslowii),  Le Conte's Sparrow (Ammodramus leconteii), and Smith's longspur (Calcarius pictus). A few species that once occurred in the region are now extinct like the passenger pigeon (Ectopistes migratorius), Carolina parakeet (Conuropsis carolinensis), ivory-billed woodpecker (Campephilus principalis), and Bachman's warbler (Vermivora bachmanii).

Reptiles: The American alligator (Alligator mississippiensis) ranges throughout all but the northwestern most area of the region, however they are not particularly common in the forested habitat compared to their abundance in the open marshlands and prairies to the south. The Sabine map turtle (Graptemys sabinensis) is endemic: and among the many other turtles found in the region are the alligator snapping turtle (Macrochelys temminckii), chicken turtle (Deirochelys reticularia), false map turtle (Graptemys pseudogeographica), river cooter (Pseudemys concinna), three-toed box turtle (Terrapene triunguis), eastern mud turtle (Kinosternon subrubrum), razor-backed musk turtle (Sternotherus carinatus), and spiny softshell turtle (Apalone spinifera). Lizards occurring in the Piney Woods include the green anole (Anolis carolinensis), six-lined racerunner (Aspidoscelis sexlineatus), prairie lizard (Sceloporus conssbrinus), slender glass lizard (Ophisaurus attenuatus), and a number of skinks including the five-lined skink (Plestiodon  fasciatus), broad-headed skink (Plestiodon  laticeps), southern coal skink (Plestiodon anthracinus), and little brown skink (Scincella lateralis). Snake diversity is relatively high in the Piney Woods for a temperate area of its size, with well over 30 species ranging into the region. The Louisiana pinesnake (Pituophis ruthveni) is endemic and Slowinski’s cornsnake (Pantherophis slowinskii) is nearly endemic. Five venomous snakes occur in the region, the Texas coralsnake (Micrurus tener), eastern copperhead (Agkistrodon contortrix), northern cottonmouth (Agkistrodon piscivorus), timber rattlesnake (Crotalus horridus), and pygmy rattlesnake (Sistrurus miliarius). Some of the non-venomous snakes include the rough greensnake (Opheodrys aestivus), Dekay's brownsnake (Storeria dekayi), eastern hog-nosed snake (Heterodon platirhinos), western ribbonsnake (Thamnophis proximus), glossy swampsnake (Liodytes rigida), southern watersnake (Nerodia fasciata), diamond-back watersnake (Nerodia rhombifer), red-bellied mudsnake (Farancia abacura), North American racer (Coluber constrictor), coachwhip (Masticophis flagellum), scarletsnake (Cemophora coccinea), prairie kingsnake (Lampropeltis calligaster), speckled kingsnake (Lampropeltis holbrooki), western ratsnake (Pantherophis obsoletus). and at least a dozen others.

Amphibians: Over a dozen species of salamanders occur in the Piney Woods. The Louisiana slimy salamander (Plethodon kisatchie) of northern Louisiana and adjacent areas of southern Arkansas is endemic to the region. The three-toed amphiuma (Amphiuma tridactylum), commonly growing 18 to 30 inches (46-76 cm.), and other species such as the Gulf Coast waterdog (Necturus beyeri), Red River mudpuppy (Necturus louisianensis), and western lesser siren (Siren intermedia) are entirely aquatic. Other salamanders include the spotted salamander (Ambystoma maculatum), marbled salamander (Ambystoma opacum), mole salamander (Ambystoma talpoideum), small-mouthed salamander (Ambystoma texanum), spotted dusky salamander (Desmognathus conanti), western dwarf salamander (Eurycea paludicola), and the eastern newt (Notophthalmus viridescens). Anurans (frogs and toads) found in the Piney Woods include Blanchard’s cricket frog (Acris blanchardi), Cope’s gray treefrog (Hyla chrysoscelis), green treefrog (Hyla cinerea), cajun chorus frog (Pseudacris fouquettei), spring peeper (Pseudacris crucifer), eastern narrow-mouthed toad (Gastrophryne carolinensis), Hurter’s spadefoot toad (Scaphiopus hurterii), American bullfrog (Lithobates catesbeianus), bronze frog (Lithobates clamitans), pickerel frog (Lithobates palustris), and southern leopard frog (Lithobates sphenocephalus). The American toad (Anaxyrus americanus) occurs in northern areas and the Gulf Coast toad (Incilius nebulifer) occurs in the south. The Fowler’s toad (Anaxyrus fowleri) ranges throughout Arkansas and Louisiana, but populations in east Texas intergraded with Woodhouse's toad (Anaxyrus woodhousii), however some regard the east Texas populations as a distinct species, the east Texas toad (Anaxyrus velatus).

Fish: The Piney Woods are rich in fish diversity. Fish occurring in the region include the chestnut lamprey (Ichthyomyzon castaneus), southern brook lamprey (Ichthyomyzon gagei), paddlefish (Polyodon spathula), alligator gar (Atractosteus spatula), spotted gar (Lepisosteus oculatus), bowfin (Amia calva), and redfin pickerel (Esox americanus). Some sport fish native to the Piney Woods include largemouth bass (Micropterus salmoides), spotted bass (Micropterus punctulatus), white bass (Morone chrysops), yellow bass (Morone mississippiensis), black crappie (Pomoxis nigromaculatus), white crappie (Pomoxis annularis), blue catfish (Ictalurus furcatus), channel catfish (Ictalurus punctatus), yellow bullhead (Ictalurus natalis), black bullhead (Ictalurus melas), redear sunfish (Lepomis microlophus), and longear sunfish (Lepomis megalotis). A multitude of smaller fish inhabit the waters of the Piney Woods. Endemics include the bluehead shiner (Pteronotropis hubbsi) and Creole darter (Etheostoma collettei). The western mosquitofish (Gambusia affinis), a species that has been widely introduced around the world and considered a pest in many areas, is a native in the Piney Woods. Just a few of the other small fish in the region include blacktail shiner (Cyprinella venusta), pallid shiner (Hybopsis amnis), blackspot shiner (Notropis  atrocaudalis), peppered shiner (Notropis perpallidus), Sabine shiner (Notropis sabinae), weed shiner (Notropis texanus), blacktail redhorse (Moxostoma poecilurum), freckled madtom (Noturus nocturnus), brown madtom (Noturus  phaeus), Blair's starhead topminnow (Fundulus blairae), golden topminnow (Fundulus chrysotus), blachspotted topminnow (Fundulus olivaceus), bantma sunfish (Lepomis symmetricus), scaly sand darter (Ammocrypta vivax), redspot darter (Etheostoma artesiae), mud darter (Etheostoma asprigene), harlequin darter (Etheostoma histrio), and goldstripe darter (Etheostoma parvipinne).

Some endemic flora and fauna of the Piney Woods (threatened species: Federal++; State +: historical isolated Illinois population now extirpated = *).

Conservation and threats

National preserve
One National Preserve, the Big Thicket National Preserve, in the southern part of the Texas portion of the Piney Woods region, currently consists of fourteen named, non-contiguous units scattered across a wide area bounded roughly by Pine Island Bayou in Hardin County, Texas to the south, the Neches River bottom to the east (units on both sides of the river), the Trinity River to the west and Steinhagen Reservoir to the north. The preserve contains ten distinct ecosystems according to the National Park Service. Big Thicket National Preserve is one of two UNESCO Biosphere Reserves in Texas. The preserve has also been listed as a Globally Important Bird Area by the American Bird Conservancy. The preserve was established in 1974 under 16 U.S. Code § 698 - Big Thicket National Preserve "...to assure the preservation, conservation, and protection of the natural, scenic, and recreational values of a significant portion of the Big Thicket area in the State of Texas..."

Protected and public lands
Federal Land

United States Department of the Interior, National Park Service
 Big Thicket National Preserve (113,114 acres), Texas

United States Department of the Interior, U.S. Fish & Wildlife Service

United States Department of Agriculture, U. S. Forest Service
Managed under a multiple-use concept (by law), balancing between timber harvesting, grazing, minerals, soil and water, fish and wildlife, recreation, and public needs, with no single resource emphasized to the detriment of others.

Arkansas (See also List of Arkansas state parks)

Louisiana Department of Wildlife and Fisheries 

Oklahoma

Texas Parks and Wildlife Department (Some Texas Wildlife Management Areas leased from the U. S. Forest Service and located within National Forest are not included here)

Folklore
The Piney Woods Region of the four state area is a noted area for Bigfoot (Sasquatch) sightings; with many legends dating back to pre European settlement. One such noted legend is the story of the Fouke Monster of Southern Arkansas; documented in the 1972 film The Legend of Boggy Creek. The area according to references lists this area to be the third highest in North America for these such sightings.  

Melanistic (black) cougars, another probable cryptid, have been noted by residents.

See also
Big Thicket
History of Texas forests
List of ecoregions in the United States (WWF)
Lost Pines Forest, a disjunct forest genetically related to the Piney Woods, over 100 miles to the west in central Texas

References

External links 
 Experience Nature, Arts & Culture, History & Heritage Destinations in the Texas Pineywoods

Temperate coniferous forests of the United States
Ecoregions of the United States
Forests of Arkansas
Forests of Louisiana
Forests of Oklahoma
Forests of Texas
Natural history of Arkansas
Natural history of Louisiana
Natural history of Oklahoma
Natural history of Texas
Plant communities of the Eastern United States
Plant communities of Louisiana
Regions of Texas
Nearctic ecoregions